Garden cress oil is obtained from garden cress (Lepidium sativum L) seeds, by cold pressing (hydraulic pressing), solvent extraction (soxhlet) and supercritical CO2. The total oil content of garden cress seeds is 21.54% (by solvent extraction method) garden cress oil has a typical smell of mustard oil but less pungent than mustard oil.

References 

Vegetable oils